Donald Archibald MacDonald  (23 February 1895 – 5 May 1965) was a British wrestler who competed in the 1920 Summer Olympics and the 1924 Summer Olympics. In 1924, at the 1924 Summer Olympics, he won the bronze medal in the freestyle wrestling heavyweight class.

References

External links
 

1895 births
1965 deaths
People from the Isle of Skye
Olympic wrestlers of Great Britain
Wrestlers at the 1920 Summer Olympics
Wrestlers at the 1924 Summer Olympics
British male sport wrestlers
Olympic bronze medallists for Great Britain
Olympic medalists in wrestling
Medalists at the 1924 Summer Olympics
Scottish Olympic medallists